Basketball at the 2006 Asian Games was the second early start among the sports in the games. It was played from 23 November to 15 December 2006. In this competition, 20 teams participated in the men's competition and 6 teams played in the women's tournament. The events were held at the Basketball Indoor Hall.

The Philippines national basketball team, winners of four gold medals in previous Games, did not participate in the basketball competition due to their suspension by the International Basketball Federation (FIBA). The political interference and conflict between the Basketball Association of the Philippines (BAP) and Philippine Olympic Committee (POC) was the cause of the suspension.

Schedule

Medalists

Medal table

Draw
The teams were seeded based on their final ranking at the 2005 FIBA Asia Championship and 2005 FIBA Asia Championship for Women.

Men
Twelve lower-ranked teams had to play in Round 1; 12 other teams qualify directly for the tournament proper.

Round 1 – Group A
 (12)

Round 1 – Group B
 (11)

Round 1 – Group C
 (15)

Round 1 – Group D
 (13)
*

Preliminary – Group E
 (Host)
 (4)
 (6)
 (7)
1st Round 1 – Group A
1st Round 1 – Group B

Preliminary – Group F
 (1)
 (2)
 (5)
 (10)*
1st Round 1 – Group C
1st Round 1 – Group D

* Chinese Taipei despite finishing 9th was unseeded in original draw but later replaced Kazakhstan in preliminary round.

Women

Group X
 (1)
 (4)
 (10)*

Group Y
 (2)
 (5)
 (7)*

* Withdrew.

Final standing

Men

Women

References

jabba-net.com
Results

External links
Official website

 
Basketball
2006
2006–07 in Asian basketball
International basketball competitions hosted by Qatar